Diana's Peak is the highest point, at , on the island of Saint Helena, a British overseas territory in the South Atlantic Ocean.  It is of volcanic origin.  The mountain and its surroundings with a total area of 81 ha were proclaimed a national park in March 1996, the first on the island.  It is a preserve of several endangered endemic species, including tree fern, he cabbage and black cabbage trees, and whitewood. The park contains walking paths connecting the peaks - Mt. Actaeon (814m), Diana's Peak and Cuckold's Point (815m). The two shorter peaks are topped by large Norfolk pines. On the northern slopes there is a nursery for endemic species.

The peak is located at the tripoint where the districts of Sandy Bay (southwest), Levelwood (east) and Longwood (north) meet. The closest settlements are Bamboo Hedge (the main settlement of Sandy Bay District), Hutt's Gate (in Longwood District) and Levelwood Village.

Gallery

See also

List of mountains and hills of Saint Helena, Ascension and Tristan da Cunha
Geography of Saint Helena

References

Geography of Saint Helena
Volcanoes of Saint Helena
National parks of Saint Helena, Ascension and Tristan da Cunha
Mountains and hills of British Overseas Territories